Edward Haight (March 26, 1817 – September 15, 1885) was an American politician and businessman from New York City.  He served in Congress for one term, 1861 to 1863, during the American Civil War.

Biography 
Haight was born on Park Place in New York City. He attended the common schools and was employed in a countinghouse early in life.  In 1838, he entered the firm of Cromwell, Haight & Co., dry goods importers on Maiden Lane.

In 1839, Haight married Sarah Louise Burgoyne, of Charleston, South Carolina. He moved to Westchester, New York (now in The Bronx, but then in Westchester County) in 1850. He was a director of the National Bank of New York. He organized the Bank of the Commonwealth of New York City in 1856, and was its president until 1870.  After 1870, he was in business with his son Edward Jr. in the brokerage firm of Haight & Company on Wall Street.

Congress 
Haight was elected as a Democrat to the 37th United States Congress (March 4, 1861 - March 3, 1863).  He was a War Democrat and in 1862 was an unsuccessful candidate of the Union Party, as the Republican Party was known that year, for reelection to the 38th United States Congress.

Death 
Haight died in Westchester, New York. He is buried in Trinity Church Cemetery in New York City.

References

External links
Congressional Biography of Edward Haight
Edward Haight entry at The Political Graveyard

1817 births
1885 deaths
American bankers
New York (state) Unionists
Politicians from New York City
People of New York (state) in the American Civil War
Democratic Party members of the United States House of Representatives from New York (state)
Burials at Trinity Church Cemetery
19th-century American politicians
19th-century American businesspeople